Pestovo is a rural locality (a village) in Teplogorskoye Rural Settlement, Velikoustyugsky District, Vologda Oblast, Russia. The population was 5 as of 2002.

Geography 
The distance to Veliky Ustyug is 78 km, to Teplogorye is 8 km. Votchevo is the nearest rural locality.

References 

Rural localities in Velikoustyugsky District